Chenjia is a town in Chongming District, Shanghai, China. It lies in southeastern Chongming Island and is the site of the northern end of the Yangtze River Bridge, which connects Chongming to Changxing and the Yangtze Tunnel to Baoshan District in Shanghai.

Towns in Shanghai
Chongming District